Tampines Constituency was a constituency in Tampines, Singapore.

History

In the 1955 general elections, this ward started as part of Punggol–Tampines SMC which consisted of largely present-day Hougang, Pasir Ris, Punggol, Sengkang, Simei and Tampines. These were considered rural areas of Singapore and had a very low population (there were only 6,628 voters then, of which only 3,886 of them turned out to vote).

Subsequently, in 1959, this ward was split into Punggol SMC and Tampines SMC. The present-day Hougang, Punggol and Sengkang were hived off as Punggol SMC while Tampines SMC took on significant portions of Ulu Bedok SMC to become one of the larger wards in eastern Singapore.  Thus, Tampines SMC was made up of present-day Bedok (except Kampong Chai Chee which is part of the Kampong Kembangan SMC), Pasir Ris, Simei, Tampines. It remained thus until 1968 when Bedok was largely transferred to Kampong Chai Chee SMC.

From 1968, no significant changes were made to the SMC until 1984 when Simei and part of Tampines (which is south of Tampines Avenue 2) formed the new Changkat SMC due to the growing population in the fast-development in Tampines New Town. From 1984 to 1988, this ward then only consisted of present-day Tampines and Pasir Ris. The ward only contain the residents committees in Tampines that is north of Tampines Avenue 2.

As Tampines New Town continued to grow, it was subsumed into the Tampines Group Representation Constituency in 1988 which was the first election in which the Group Representation Constituency system was used. The fast-growing Tampines had 60,084 voters; and it was necessary to split into three.

Member of Parliament

Elections

Candidates and Results

Elections in the 1980s

Elections in the 1970s

Elections in the 1960s

Notes: SPA joins UMNO-MCA-MIC alliance to form SA in 1963 GE.

Elections in the 1950s

See also
Tampines GRC
Tampines

References

1984 General Election's result
1980 General Election's result
1976 General Election's result
1972 General Election's result
1968 General Election's result
1967 By Election's result
1963 General Election's result
1959 General Election's result
In 1955, it started with Punggol - Tampines
Map of Punggol–Tampines ward in 1955
Map of Tampines ward in 1959
Map of Tampines ward in 1963
Map of Tampines ward in 1968
Map of Tampines ward in 1972
Map of Tampines ward in 1976
Map of Tampines ward in 1980
Map of Tampines ward in 1984
Map of Tampines GRC in 1988

Singaporean electoral divisions
Tampines